Wayde Jooste (born 27 September 1991) is a South African soccer player who plays as a defender for South African Premier Division side [Maritzburg United F.C.| 
]].

References

1991 births
Living people
Sportspeople from Port Elizabeth
Soccer players from the Eastern Cape
South African soccer players
Association football midfielders
Bloemfontein Celtic F.C. players
Lamontville Golden Arrows F.C. players
Highlands Park F.C. players
Orlando Pirates F.C. players
South African Premier Division players